Pavel Chupa (born 20 September 1994) is a Russian freestyle skier. He competed in the 2018 Winter Olympics.

References

1994 births
Living people
Freestyle skiers at the 2018 Winter Olympics
Russian male freestyle skiers
Olympic freestyle skiers of Russia
Universiade bronze medalists for Russia
Universiade medalists in freestyle skiing
Competitors at the 2015 Winter Universiade